Laetamur admodum issued November 1, 1956,  is an encyclical of Pope Pius XII renewing his request for prayers for peace for Poland, Hungary, and the Middle East.

The Holy Father is  most pleased to learn that the Catholic World responded with generosity and enthusiasm to his request for public prayers. And so seems that maybe a new dawn of peace based on justice seems to be breaking at long last for the people of Poland and Hungary. He was happy to learn,  that  Cardinals  Stefan Wyszynski and Joseph Mindszenty, Archbishop of Esztergom, who had both been expelled from their Sees, have been restored to their positions,  and were warmly welcomed  by their faithful. He asks all the Catholics of those countries to unite themselves with their shepherds. True peace has not materialized yet. And war continues in the Middle East.

References

External links 

 Encyclical Laetamur admodum on the Vatican website

Persecution of Catholics during the pontificate of Pope Pius XII
Encyclicals of Pope Pius XII
November 1956 events
1956 in Christianity